The Ikarus 215 (Икарус 215 in Serbian)  twin-engine plane, was a Yugoslav light bomber and a training aircraft of mixed construction, the prototype flew in 1949. It did not go into production. The prototype was used for training and as a liaison. It was designed and built at the Ikarus factory in Zemun-Belgrade.

Design and development

Ikarus 215 was designed by engineer constructor Dušan Stankov, and was originally designed before the World War II as a Zmaj R-1 multi-purpose fighter - bomber - but the scout redesigned given the available engines and purpose. The prototype first flew in 1949. It was a twin engined low-wing aircraft of mixed construction, with a crew of two to four (depending on the role). The undercarriage retracted into the engine nacelles backward, while the tail wheel was fixed. The prototype was driven by two twelve-cylinder, air-cooled, in-line piston engines Ranger SVG-770 C-B1. Aircraft wing had a wooden structure lined with plywood, was the trapezoid-shaped wings and the ends were rounded. The construction of the fuselage was made from an oval-shaped duralumin covered cardboard timber.

Operational history
Aircraft Ikarus 215 series are not produced. During testing it was determined that the aircraft will not be able to respond to the primary purpose (light twin-engine bomber), it has also contributed to the unexpectedly rapid development of aviation, fighter-bomber takes on the role of light bomber. Ikarus 215 prototype aircraft is mainly used as a training school for the training of bomber pilots as the plane for the connection. Withdrawn from use in  1957.

Operators

Yugoslav Air Force 1 aircraft

Specifications

See also
SFR Yugoslav Air Force
Ranger V-770
Zmaj R-1
Dušan Stankov

Notes

References

 Gunston, Bill. World Encyclopedia of Aero Engines. Cambridge, England. Patrick Stephens Limited, 1989. 

 Бојан Б. Димитријевић "Југословенско ратно ваздухопловство 1942.-1992."
 Жутић. Н. и Бошковић. Л., Икарус - Икарбус: 1923 - 1998,(Монографија 75 година Икаруса), Икарбус, Београд, 1999.
 Златко Рендулић, Авиони домаће конструкције после Другог светског рата, Лола институт, Београд, 1996. год.

External links

 http://vazduhoplovnetradicijesrbije.rs/index.php/istorija/247-ikarus-215
 www.aeroflight.co.uk/waf/yugo/af2/types/ikarus.htm
 www.dragan.freeservers.com

Ikarus aircraft
1940s Yugoslav bomber aircraft
1940s Yugoslav military trainer aircraft
Low-wing aircraft
Twin piston-engined tractor aircraft
Aircraft first flown in 1949